Nake may refer to:

Nake language
Frieder Nake (born 1938), mathematician, computer scientist, and computer artist
Nake M. Kamrany (born 1934), American economist and academic

See also

 
 Knake (disambiguation)
 Knacke (disambiguation)